António Roquete (born 26 May 1955) is a Portuguese judoka. He competed at the 1972, 1976, 1980 and the 1984 Summer Olympics.

References

1955 births
Living people
Portuguese male judoka
Olympic judoka of Portugal
Judoka at the 1972 Summer Olympics
Judoka at the 1976 Summer Olympics
Judoka at the 1980 Summer Olympics
Judoka at the 1984 Summer Olympics
Place of birth missing (living people)